Yakalla Grama Niladhari Division is a Grama Niladhari Division of the Galenbindunuwewa Divisional Secretariat  of Anuradhapura District  of North Central Province, Sri Lanka .  It has Grama Niladhari Division Code 186.

Yakalla is surrounded by the Ihala Galkulama, Hurulumeegahapattiya, Manankattiya, Muriyakadawala and Navakkulama  Grama Niladhari Divisions.

Demographics

Ethnicity 

The Yakalla Grama Niladhari Division has a Sinhalese majority (100.0%) . In comparison, the Galenbindunuwewa Divisional Secretariat (which contains the Yakalla Grama Niladhari Division) has a Sinhalese majority (96.9%)

Religion 

The Yakalla Grama Niladhari Division has a Buddhist majority (99.2%) . In comparison, the Galenbindunuwewa Divisional Secretariat (which contains the Yakalla Grama Niladhari Division) has a Buddhist majority (96.7%)

Grama Niladhari Divisions of Galenbindunuwewa Divisional Secretariat

References